Cerithideopsis pliculosa, common name the plicate horn shell, is a species of sea snail, a marine gastropod mollusk in the family Potamididae.

Distribution
The species is found on the Caribbean coast of the US. It is genetically distinct from Cerithideopsis californica of the Pacific coast of the US. The two species became isolated by the emergence of the Isthmus of Panama three million years ago. DNA analysis suggests that there was some crossing of the Isthmus in both directions, and the common shorebirds called willets are suspected as carriers. Willet droppings have been placed in dishes of salt water with the result that some snails hatched out.

Description 
The maximum recorded shell length is 33 mm.

Habitat 
The species has been found in water at recorded depths from 0 to 2 m.

References

 Reid D.G. & Claremont M. (2014) The genus Cerithideopsis Thiele, 1929 (Gastropoda: Potamididae) in the Indo-West Pacific region. Zootaxa 3779(1): 61-80
 Rosenberg, G.; Moretzsohn, F.; García, E. F. (2009). Gastropoda (Mollusca) of the Gulf of Mexico, Pp. 579–699 in: Felder, D.L. and D.K. Camp (eds.), Gulf of Mexico–Origins, Waters, and Biota. Texas A&M Press, College Station, Texas.

External links
 

Potamididae
Gastropods described in 1829